The Terrible People is a 1926 crime novel by the British writer Edgar Wallace.

Adaptations
The novel was turned into The Terrible People an American film serial in 1928 and The Terrible People (1960), part of the long-running German series of Edgar Wallace adaptations of the 1960s.

References

External links
 The Terrible People at Project Gutenberg Australia

1926 British novels
Novels by Edgar Wallace
British novels adapted into films
Novels set in London
Hodder & Stoughton books